Georgi Delchev Bradistilov (Bulgarian: Георги Делчев Брадистилов; 25 October 1904 [12 October 1904 O.S.] – 18 June 1977) was a Bulgarian mathematician.

Biography 

Georgi Bradistilov, the fourth and youngest child in the family  of the high-ranked civil servant at Bulgarian Ministry of Finance, Delcho Petkov Bradistilov (1866 – 1927), and teacher Nona Georgieva Bradistilova (1876 – 1958), was born on 12 October 1904 OS in Panagyurishte. He attended 3rd Sofia gymnasium and in 1922 entered Sofia University to study physics and mathematics. In 1927 he graduated with honors and the same year was appointed as assistant professor in mathematics.  In the 1930s he studied at the University of Paris and the University of Munich. Bradistilov was one of the last students to take Arnold Sommerfeld's course in theoretical physics before his retirement.
In 1938, he defended his doctorate, with Oskar Perron as advisor, at the University of Munich.

Upon his return to Bulgaria Dr Bradistilov taught as private docent at his alma mater Sofia University. In 1943 he joined as extraordinary professor and later as full professor the newly established Higher Technical School in Sofia, which after the Second World War was renamed the State Polytechnic. Apart from his teaching duties, he wrote the basic mathematics textbooks used for many years by future Bulgarian engineers.

He was rector of the State Polytechnic in Sofia from 1947 to 1948 and rector of the Technical University of Sofia from 1962 to 1966.  In 1958 he was awarded Doctor of Mathematics and Physics Science Degree. In 1966 he was elected corresponding member of the Bulgarian Academy of Sciences.

Georgi Bradistilov's contributions to applied mathematics are related to nonlinear differential equations and their applications to mechanics and electrotechnics, to electrostatic potential, to nonlinear oscillations.

He was notorious for his sense of humour and openness, for his love of arts and nature as well as for his refined taste, his wife being an artist educated in Florence.

Honors 

During his lifetime Georgi Bradistilov received many Bulgarian state decorations and awards. Recently a street in Sofia near the Technical University was named after him.

Selected bibliography 
 
 
 Georgi Bradistilov (1954), Higher Mathematics [Vissha matematika]	Sofia: Dŭrzh. izd-vo "Nauka i izkustvo".

Notes

References 
 Elena Vurbanova (2004), Academic Speech Delivered on the Occasion of the 100 Anniversary from the Birth of Professor Georgi Bradistilov, Sofia: Technical University. (in Bulgarian).
 Georgi Gemidzhiev (2009), History of Panagyurishte (1878–1944), Sofia: Bogianna, at 537, . (in Bulgarian).

External links
 
 
 

1904 births
1977 deaths
Corresponding Members of the Bulgarian Academy of Sciences
Bulgarian mathematicians
20th-century Bulgarian mathematicians
People from Panagyurishte
Burials at Central Sofia Cemetery
Technical University, Sofia